Malakkhanim Eyubova (born November 5, 1962, Shamakhi) is an Azerbaijani khananda (folk singer).

Life
After finishing No.155 Secondary School in Baku, she joined music school to play accordion. However, she was selected as soloist in the choir under leadership of Afsar Javanshirov.

In 1979-1984, she graduated from faculty of ‘Actor of Musical Comedy’ at the M.A.Aliyev Azerbaijan State Arts University.

She also performed in many countries of the world, including USA, Germany, Australia, France, Romania, Belgium, Russia and others. In 1995, she played the title role of Leyli in Uzeyir Hajibeyov's opera Leyli and Majnun on the stage of the Azerbaijan Academic State Opera and Ballet Theatre.

She also recorded her albums in Germany, France, and Turkey. Malakkhanim Eyubova was also awarded the title of Honored Artists and People's Artist of Azerbaijan.

References

1962 births
Living people
21st-century Azerbaijani women singers
People from Shamakhi
People's Artists of Azerbaijan
Soviet Azerbaijani people
Azerbaijan State University of Culture and Arts alumni
Mugham singers
20th-century Azerbaijani women singers